Teodoro Duclère (1816–1867) was an Italian painter, active as a landscape painter in Naples, Italy.
He was born to French parents in Naples. He is one of the painters considered to belong to the School of Posillipo that arose in Naples associated with the Dutch painter, Anton van Pitloo, who would become Duclère's father-in-law. He was a close friend of Giacinto Gigante.

Sources
  Luciana Soravia, DUCLÈRE, Teodoro in Dizionario Biografico degli Italiani, XLI volume, Rome, Istituto dell'Enciclopedia Italiana, 1992.

Other projects

1816 births
1867 deaths
19th-century Neapolitan people
19th-century Italian painters
Italian male painters
Painters from Naples
19th-century Italian male artists